Colm McManamon (Cólm Mac Meanman) is a former Gaelic footballer from Tiernaur, Mulranny, County Mayo, Ireland who played for Burrishoole and the Mayo county team. He represented Ireland twice in International Rules.

He is related to Dublin footballer Kevin McManamon.

See also
 1996 All-Ireland Senior Football Championship Final
 Geelong Football Club
 Irish experiment

References

Burrishoole Gaelic footballers
Irish international rules football players
Mayo inter-county Gaelic footballers